Frank Valdor (27 May 1937 – 5 August 2013) was one of the great German bandleaders having sold over 2.5 million records during the 1960s and 1970s. In particular, Valdor was popular for his instrumental arrangements intended to be played non-stop at parties. He has been called "King of Dynamic Party Sound". His discography consists of more than 80 LP's, 10 singles and 8 CD's. Valdor's record covers often have a "genius" graphical touch, where he is shown surrounded by scantily dressed women. His album King Size sold 25,000 copies in Finland and was awarded gold status.

Like James Last did Frank Valdor had also a period during the earlier 1970s, when he was a celebrated musician in Scandinavia. Mainly, but not exclusively, for those who at the time were older than 30 years old.

Discography (Vinyl LP's only)
In alphabetical order, in this case is "Somerset" a record producer

 16 Fantastic Golden Latin Hits 1978
  A gogo Discofoon * 7067
  Aktuell Somerset 718
  Big Band Hits – German Jukebok EP, Hippo 21001 *
  Classics for dancing Europa E 193
  Coctails for two Hippo 31003
  Dancing a la diskothek – Constanze
  Dancing And Dreaming – German Jukebox EP Hippo 21003 *
  Dancing at midnight – Hippo 41009
  Das Große stimmung album – Philips H 72 AM 231
  Dreamy Violins – German Jukebox EP Hippo 24008 *
  Dynamic Man Somerset 740/741
  Dynamic Trumpet Party Somerset 734
  Fiesta Tijuana Somerset 665
  Frank Valdor Somerset, published 1973
  Frank Valdor’s tropic beat – Popular 21165
  Glenn Miller Story – German Jukebox EP Hippo 25010 *
  Goes Western Somerset 731
  Gogo Guitars Somerset 677
  Golden Memories – German Jukebox EP Hot-Six 605 **
  Goodtime Girls
  Great Latin Hits BASF BB22862-2
  Gute Laune a gogo – Happy Trumpet Party – Telefunken NT 276
  Hammond Hitparade Somerset 669
  Happy Rosamunde Somerset 715
  Happy Sax – German Jukebox EP Somerset AP-014 *
  Happy Saxophon a go go Somerset 674
  Happy Trumpet Party 2 – Telefunken
  Happy Trumpets – German Jukebox EP Somerset AP-016 *
  Hawaii Beach Party GrandPrix GP-10033
  Heute hauÂ´n auf die pauke Somerset 759
  Hey Mister Valdor! Somerset 760
  Hits a gogo Somerset 659
  Hits am Laufenden Band RCA PPL 1-4167
  Hot Nights In Rio RCA PL 28305
  I’m Popschrittmarsch Sonic 9091
  In Mexico Somerset 712
  Jede menge hits Somerset 661
  King of Dynamic Party Sound Somerset 716/717
  King Size 2 Somerset 773
  King Size Somerset 739
  La Montanara Somerset 787
  Live in Rio Somerset 746
  Mexican Beat Hippo 41005 ***
  Mexican Fiesta Grand Prix 10041
  Music for television, films and radio Europhon ELP 530
  Music für Verliebte Hippo 41009
  My Favourite Songs Somerset 780
  Non Stop Musical – German Jukebox EP Somerset AP-015 *
  Non-Stop Musicals Somerset 663
  Polka, Polka, Polka – mit der Schützenliesel Somerset 788
  Pop no Stomp – Constanze Somerset G 688
  Pop non stop Somerset 688
  Presents the Good Time Girls Somerset 769
  Remembering Glenn Miller – German Jukebox EP Hippo 22.004 *
  Rock Festival Somerset 783
  Rubber Boat Party Somerset 748
  Rythmus Ã gogo Somerset 698
  Scandinavian Party Somerset 764
  Schlager Von Gestern Im Rythmus Von Heute Somerset 775
  Starportrait Somerset 766, 767
  Stereo, 28 trumpet hits Discofoon* 7507 131
  String of pearls Hippo 41004
  Surprise-partie 2 – Trianon c046-11396
  Swing And Sweet – German Jukebok EP Hippo 23006 *
  Tanz bis zum Umfallen Philips 88528DY
  Tanzparty a gogo – Hippo 31Â 004
  Tanzparty bei Frankie Europa E 184
  Trompeten Ã gogo 2 Somerset 742
  Trompeten Ã gogo Somerset 660
  Tropical Dancing RCA PPL1-4218
  Tropical evergreens – Bellaphone
  Tropicana – Center 17 023 ST
  Trumpets for Dancing Somerset 680
  Udo Jürgens Hits for dancing Somerset 699
  Unter südlicher sonne Somerset 723
  Viva Mexico (Frank Valdor’s Tropic Beats), Grammoclub Ex Libris EL 12 013, Schweiz, LP 1965/1966
  Volkslieder aus aller Welt – Europa E 187
  Weekend party – Decca SLK 16Â 364
  Weekend Party Decca SLK 16 364-P
  Wir machen durch… Somerset 778
  Wodka á Gogo Somerset 691
  Wonderful World of Trumpets RCA PPL2-4084
  Wünscht Frohe Weihnacht RCA PPL1-4060

References

External links
 Official website

1937 births
2013 deaths
Bandleaders
Place of birth missing
20th-century German musicians
20th-century German male musicians